This page is an overview of the qualification criteria for the 2014 UCI Road World Championships.

Elite events

Elite men's road race

Qualification will be based on performances on the UCI run tours during 2014. Results from January to the middle of August would count towards the qualification criteria on both the 2014 UCI World Tour and the UCI Continental Circuits across the world, with the rankings being determined upon the release of the numerous tour rankings on 15 August 2014.

Elite women's road race

Qualification will be based mainly on the 2014 UCI Nation Ranking as of 15 August 2014. The first five nations in this classification qualified 7 riders to start, the next ten nations qualified 6 riders to start and the next 5 nations qualified 5 riders to start. Other nations and non ranked nations had the possibility to send 3 riders to start. Moreover, the outgoing World Champion and continental champions are qualified to take part in the race on top of the nation numbers.

Elite men's time trial

All National Federations may enter 4 riders of whom 2 may start. In addition to this number, the outgoing World Champion and the current continental champions may take part.

Elite women's time trial

All National Federations may enter 4 riders of whom 2 may start. In addition to this number, the outgoing World Champion and the current continental champions may take part.

Men's team time trial

It is an obligation for all 2014 UCI ProTeams to participate. Besides of that invitations are sent to the 20 leading teams of the 2014 UCI Europe Tour, top 5 leading teams of the 2013–14 UCI America Tour and 2013–14 UCI Asia Tour and the leading teams of the 2013–14 UCI Africa Tour and 2014 UCI Oceania Tour on 15 August 2014. Teams that accept the invitation within the deadline have the right to participate. Every participating team may register nine riders from its team roster (excluding stagiaires) and has to select six riders to compete in the event.

Women's team time trial

Invitations are sent to the 25 leading UCI Women's Teams in the UCI Teams Ranking on 15 August 2014. Teams that accept the invitation within the deadline have the right to participate. Every participating team may register nine riders from its team roster (excluding stagiaires) and has to select six riders to compete in the event.

Under-23 events

Men's under-23 road race

Qualification is based on performances on the UCI run tours and the Men Under 23 Nations’ Cup during 2014. Results from January to the middle of August would count towards the qualification criteria. The first 5 nations of the final classification of the Men Under 23 Nations’ Cup are entitled to an
extra rider. In addition to this number the current continental champions may take part. The outgoing World Champion is not allowed to start because she is not an under-23 rider anymore.

Men's under-23 time trial

All National Federations may enter 4 riders of whom 2 may start. In addition to this number, the outgoing World Champion and the current continental champions may take part.

Junior events

Men's junior road race

Qualification will be based mainly on the final UCI Juniors Nations' Cup ranking as of 15 August 2014. The first ten nations in this classification qualified 6 riders to start, the next five nations qualified 5 riders to start and the next 5 nations qualified 4 riders to start. Spain, as the organizing nation, shall be entitled 5 riders to start. Other nations and non ranked nations had the possibility to send 3 riders to start. Moreover, continental champions are qualified to take part in the race on top of the nation numbers. The outgoing World Champion is not allowed to take part because he is not a junior rider anymore.

Women's junior road race

All National Federations may enter 8 riders of whom 4 may start. In addition to this number the current continental champions may take part. The outgoing World Champion is not allowed to start because she is not a junior rider anymore.

Men's junior time trial

All National Federations may enter 4 riders of whom 2 may start. In addition to this number, the outgoing World Champion and the current continental champions may take part.

Women's junior time trial

All National Federations may enter 4 riders of whom 2 may start. In addition to this number the current continental champions may take part. The outgoing World Champion is not allowed to start because she is not a junior rider anymore.

References

Qualification
Qualification for the UCI Road World Championships